The Green Party of the United States held primaries''' in several states in 2008. Cynthia McKinney won most of the primaries and was formally nominated as the party's nominee during the 2008 Green National Convention.

Candidates

Schedule

Results

February

Florida primary (February 1) 
 
The Green Party held a mail-in primary in Florida on February 1.

Arkansas primary (February 5)

California primary (February 5) 
The California primary took place on February 5. Ralph Nader won, despite not running for the nomination of the party.

Illinois primary (February 5) 

The Illinois primary took place on February 5.

Massachusetts primary (February 5) 

The Massachusetts primary took place on February 5. Six candidates appeared on the ballot. Ralph Nader won, despite not running for the nomination of the party.

Maine caucuses (February 10)

District of Columbia primary (February 12) 
The District of Columbia primary took place on February 12.

March

Mississippi caucuses (March 1) 
Mississippi held caucuses on March 1.

North Carolina (March 1) 
Mississippi held their vote on March 1.

Minnesota caucuses (March 4) 
The party also held a caucus and mail-in vote on March 4.

The delegates were assigned by a vote at the state convention on June 8.

Wisconsin Presidential Preference Convention (March 29) 
Wisconsin selected their delegates at the "Wisconsin Green Party Spring Gathering and Presidential Preference Convention" on March 29. While only McKinney and Mesplay were on the ballot, several other candidates received votes as write-ins.

April

Ohio primary (March 4–April 4) 
Ohio held a vote-by-mail primary from March 4 through April 4.

Rhode Island convention (April 7)

Indiana caucuses (April 9) 
The Indiana caucuses were party-run rather than state-organized.

Connecticut convention (April 26) 
The Green Party of Connecticut assigned their delegates based upon a vote held at their annual meeting on April 26, 2008.

May

Maryland primary (May 3) 
Maryland held a primary where voters could either mail-in their ballots before April 30 or vote in-person at the Maryland Green Party Annual Assembly on May 3.

South Carolina convention (May 3) 
South Carolina held a party convention on May 3.

Missouri convention (May 10) 
Missouri held a state convention on May 10.

Pennsylvania caucuses (April 13—May 10) 
The Green Party of Pennsylvania's presidential caucuses were held April 13-May 10. These caucuses were party-sponsored rather than state-run.

Nebraska primary (May 13) 
The Nebraska primary took place on May 13.

Iowa convention (May 17) 
The Iowa convention took place on May 17.

Montana convention (May 31) 
Montana appointed their eight delegates at a state convention on May 31.

New York state primary (May 31) 
The New York Green Party ballots were publicly counted on May 31. The primary was a party-run mail-in primary.

This primary awarded 28 of New York's 40 delegates. New York City held a separate primary to award the remaining 12 delegates.

June

Minnesota convention (June 8) 
The Minnesota party previously held a caucus and mail-in vote on March 4. The delegates, however, were assigned by a vote at the state convention on June 8.

New Mexico primary (June 8) 
The New Mexico Green Party held its vote on June 8. A total of seventeen votes were cast, with 11 going to McKinney, 4 votes going to "none of the above", and 1 vote each going to Kat Swift, Kent Mesplay, and Jesse Johnson.

New York City primary (June 8) 
A second vote awarding New York's remaining 12 delegates was held on June 8 in New York City to appoint a remaining 12 of New York's delegates.

Texas convention (June 14) 
The selection of Texas' delegation took place on June 14 at the state Green convention, held at S.H.A.P.E.'s Harambee Center in Houston.

Michigan convention (June 26–27) 
The Michigan convention took place June 26–27 at the Franke Center for the Arts in Marshall, Michigan.

References